Ivan de Souza Monteiro (born 1960, in Manaus) is a Brazilian electronic engineer, former president of the oil state company Petrobras. Previously, Monteiro was CFO of the company. Before heading Petrobras, Monteiro worked in Banco do Brasil.

Career
Monteiro was taken to Petrobras in 2015 by Aldemir Bendine, former president of Banco do Brasil (BB), nominated in that year as president of the company by president Dilma Rousseff. Monteiro had been vice-president of the Financial Management and Affairs with Investors of BB, in office between 2009 and 2015.

In June 2018, after Pedro Parente's departure, Monteiro was chosen by the Petrobras Administration Council as acting president, later nominated by Michel Temer as president.

See also
 Petrobras
 Aldemir Bendine
 Pedro Parente

References

1960 births
Living people
People from Manaus
Brazilian engineers
Brazilian chief executives